Mount Zion Cemetery may refer to:

United States
 Mount Zion Cemetery (Walnut Ridge, Arkansas)
 Mount Zion Cemetery (Los Angeles, California)
 Mount Zion Church and Cemetery (Hallsville, Missouri)
 Mount Zion African Methodist Episcopal Church and Mount Zion Cemetery, New Jersey
 Mount Zion Cemetery (Kingston, New York)
 Mount Zion Cemetery (New York City), New York
 Mt. Zion Church and Cemetery (Elkhorn, Tennessee)
 Mount Zion Cemetery (Washington, D.C.)

Other places
 Mount Zion Cemetery, Jerusalem

See also
 Mount Zion (disambiguation)